Mario Party 4 is a 2002 party video game developed by Hudson Soft and published by Nintendo for the GameCube. The game is the fourth installment in the Mario Party series and is the first game in the series to be released for the GameCube. Like the previous games in the series, it features eight playable characters: Mario, Luigi, Princess Peach, Yoshi, Wario, Donkey Kong, Princess Daisy, and Waluigi from the Mario franchise, who can be directed as characters on 6 themed game boards. The objective is to earn as many stars as possible, which are obtained by purchase from a single predefined space on the game board. Each character's movement is determined by a roll of a die, with a roll from each player forming a single turn. Each turn is followed by a minigame in which characters compete for coins they can use to purchase items and stars.

Mario Party 4 was met with mixed reception, with some complaints regarding a lack of originality and slow pacing during games. It won the Family Game of the Year award at the Interactive Achievement Awards of 2003, and was followed by Mario Party 5 in 2003.

Gameplay

Mario Party 4 is based on an interactive board game played by 4 characters from the Mario series, which are controlled either by the player or the game's Artificial Intelligence (AI). The game features 8 playable characters, although they do not have any different gameplay attributes from each other (save for favouring certain items when controlled by the AI). Players can arrange their characters into opposing pairs, or play independently in a battle royale. As with most board games, each participant takes turns in rolling a dice block (1 to 10) to determine the number of spaces moved on the board. There are 60 minigames, one of which follows each round of four turns, which yields a coin prize for the winner. Twenty coins are required to purchase a star, with the victor being the character with the most stars at the end of the game. The length of a game can vary as the predetermined number of minigames is adjustable in multiples of 5 (min.10 max.50). Stars are usually attained by purchase at the specific space on the board where it is set, with the star location changing to another space after every acquisition. Three extra stars can be obtained if "Bonus mode" is switched on, with a star each awarded to the player with the most minigames won, most coins collected, and most happening spaces visited. This mode also contains hidden blocks, which will grant either coins or a star when located and hit.

Mario Party 4 features 6 boards, 5 of which take their name from a secondary Mario character, such as Goomba. The boards are themed to correspond with their titular character, and contain specialised features to reflect this such as the roulette wheel in the casino-based "Goomba's Greedy Gala". The on-board characters follow a set route, although this becomes optional when arriving at a junction. The boards also contain multiple "Events", which are generic stations placed on every board. These include "Lottery Shops", where money is gambled on item prizes, and "Boo Houses", where Boo is paid to steal either coins or a star from an opponent. The majority of spaces on the boards are denoted by either blue or red circles, with blue granting coins and red deducting them. Alternative spaces are also available, such as "happening spaces", which trigger an event exclusive to the current board. "Mushroom Spaces" grant the user either a "Mega" or "Mini" Mushroom—"Mega Mushrooms" extend the movement range while "Mini Mushrooms" curtail it. Additionally, giant characters will bypass "Events" and stars while reduced characters can access special areas on the board via pipes. Multiple other items can be bought from on-board shops, such as "Swap Cards", which exchanges items between 2 players.

The minigames in Mario Party 4 are short, unrelated events with a specified objective that the players must attempt to meet to earn coins as a reward. Minigames are unlocked during the main "Party Mode", although they can be played outside of the game board context in "Minigame Mode". This allows the player to either freely play minigames; select which minigames they want, and control conditions for victory in a match, such as the "3-win-match"; or play 2 vs. 2 minigames to claim a space on a tic-tac-toe board. Minigames are split into 7 categories: "4-player", "1 vs 3", "2 vs 2", "Battle", "Bowser", "Story", etc.. The first 3 occur randomly after each set of turns during a party, while "Battle" can only be triggered by landing on the corresponding space on the board. Unlike regular minigames, the players must contribute their money and then compete to reclaim it or earn more by winning the minigame. There are also rarer groups of minigames, such as the Bowser minigames requiring the loser to forfeit items or coins and the minigames, which can only be accessed by characters reduced by the "Mini Mushroom". A set of minigames that cannot be played during normal conditions are located in the "Extra room", featuring Thwomp and Whomp.

The game features a loose plot in that the player must progress through "Story Mode" to earn presents from the eponymous characters of the pertaining boards. These are presents that had been brought to the player's birthday party in the game, which must be completed by earning the most stars in a board game and subsequently defeating the present giver in a special one-on-one Story minigame. This is all contained within the "Party Cube", which grants the wishes of its users; the story's climax comes in the form of Bowser, who wishes to disrupt the party with his own board, hosted by Koopa Kid. Also, unlike its predecessor, Princess Daisy and Waluigi are now playable in Story Mode.

Development
Mario Party 4, like all the games in the Mario Party series through Mario Party 8, was developed by Hudson Soft and published by Nintendo. It is the last Mario Party game to have Donkey Kong as a playable character (until Mario Party 10) and to have Wario wearing his classic long-sleeve shirt. It is also the first Mario Party game to have Yoshi's main voice replacing his classic "record-scratching" voice from the Mario Party N64 trilogy, and the first to have default teams. It is also the first Mario game to feature Peach and Daisy's current main dresses, including Daisy's short orange hair, with her current gold crown, and Caucasian skin color. It is also the second Mario Party game to use the playable characters' voice clips from the previous game.

The game was first announced in a 2002 Nintendo press conference in Tokyo, with the announcements made by Shigeru Miyamoto and Satoru Iwata. It was targeted as part of the 2002 roster of Nintendo games, which they rated as their "biggest year" for software at the time. Nintendo presented a playable demonstration of the game at E3 2002, featuring a limited set of minigames. The game featured voice acting from Charles Martinet (Mario, Luigi, Wario, and Waluigi), Jen Taylor (Peach, Daisy, and Toad), and Kazumi Totaka (Yoshi), all three of whom worked on the previous games in the Mario franchise.

Reception

Mario Party 4 received "average" reviews according to the review aggregation website Metacritic.  In Japan, Famitsu gave it a score of 30 out of 40.

GameSpot's Ryan Davis praised the game's minigame format, although he noted that "players who have already exhausted themselves on previous Mario Party titles may not find enough here to draw them back again". Eurogamer's Tom Bramwell acknowledged the variety and thematic features of the boards, but thought they were too large, resulting in a "glacial pace" when coupled with the on-board animations. Despite this, IGN praised the boards for the thematic features on each one, which helped to "ease the tediousness". The game's controls were lauded for their compatibility with the minigames and simplicity, with most minigames requiring simple actions and button presses.

The game's multiplayer was praised by reviewers, especially in comparison to the single-player "Story Mode". The multiplayer element was noted for appealing to a diverse demographic for its party game qualities and being an "'everybody' title". Conversely, "Story Mode" was criticised for exacerbating issues relating to pace, which was already remarked as having "snail's pace". Additionally, the Artificial Intelligence involved was bemoaned for contributing an imbalance in the game, with the random availability of quality items giving players an unfair advantage. The "reversal of fortune" space, which initiates a minigame by which the victor would receive another player's stars or coins, was criticised for similar reasons, as it potentially penalises players who do well in the game. The minigames were mainly met with a positive reaction, with critics praising their simplicity. The grouping feature in the minigames were also welcomed for contributing a new dynamic of gameplay, although Bramwell commented that "it might seem a little odd to gang up with your competitors in some cases".

Most reviewers noted the game's graphical improvement from its predecessors, with the minigames' visual style in particular receiving praise. Although IGN remarked that the game was graphically a "huge improvement since we last saw the franchise", they proceeded to comment that "It's a mixed bag of good and bad". GameSpot complained that the character animations appear "a bit lifeless" and that the boards were not aesthetically pleasing. The game's audio was met with an ambivalent reaction, with critics enjoying the music but complaining about the "annoying" character catchphrases. While not memorable, the music was lauded for fitting the game's whimsical nature.

Both websites The Game of Nerds and The Gamer ranked Mario Party 4 the best entry in the series.

Lifewire called it the best Mario Party game of the 4 released on the GameCube.

Den of Geek! thought it was the 4th best game in the series, and the best of the 4 on the GameCube. They thought that it was one of the best in the series due to the minigames.

Sales and accolades
Mario Party 4 won the "Family Game of The Year" award at the 2003 Interactive Achievement Awards.  It was nominated for GameSpots annual "Best Party Game on GameCube" award, which went to Super Monkey Ball 2.

The game sold 1,100,000 units from its release to December 27, 2007, in North America, and an additional 902,827 copies in Japan, bringing its overall sales to 2,000,000.

References

External links

2002 video games
GameCube games
GameCube-only games
Interactive Achievement Award winners
Mario Party
Party video games
Video games about size change
Video games developed in Japan
Video games set in amusement parks

de:Mario Party#Mario Party 4
D.I.C.E. Award for Family Game of the Year winners
Multiplayer and single-player video games